Easy to Make Money, originally titled It's Easy to Make Money is a 1919 American silent comedy film directed by Edwin Carewe. It stars Bert Lytell, Gertrude Selby, and Frank Currier, and was released on August 4, 1919.

Cast

References

External links

 
 
 
 lantern slide(Wayback Machine)

Films directed by Edwin Carewe
Metro Pictures films
American silent feature films
American black-and-white films
Silent American comedy films
1919 comedy films
1919 films
Films produced by B. A. Rolfe
1910s American films